Ricardo Lazbal (born in Buenos Aires, Argentina) is a former Argentine footballer who played for clubs in Argentina and Chile.

Teams
  All Boys 1966–1968
  River Plate 1969–1971
  Loma Negra 1972
  Gimnasia y Esgrima de La Plata 1973
  Atlético Ledesma 1974
  San Lorenzo 1975
  Palestino 1976–1979

Titles
  Palestino 1978 (Chilean Primera División Championship)

External links
 

Living people
Argentine footballers
Argentine expatriate footballers
All Boys footballers
Club Atlético River Plate footballers
San Lorenzo de Almagro footballers
Club de Gimnasia y Esgrima La Plata footballers
Club Deportivo Palestino footballers
Chilean Primera División players
Argentine Primera División players
Expatriate footballers in Chile
Association football midfielders
Year of birth missing (living people)
Footballers from Buenos Aires